Project Viper is a 2002 science-fiction thriller  starring Patrick Muldoon, Theresa Russell, Curtis Armstrong and Tamara Davies that debuted as a Sci Fi Pictures TV-movie on the Sci Fi Channel. It was directed by Jim Wynorski under the pseudonym "Jay Andrews".

Plot
The Space Shuttle Olympus is on a routine mission, but with a far-from-routine payload: "Project Viper", an experimental hybrid of human genes and computer chips, designed to adapt to any environment, particularly that of the planet Mars. But as the shuttle crew prepares to launch the first prototype, referred to as "Viper", into space, an unexpected power glitch occurs, causing the container housing the prototype to break open. Soon the astronauts are killed by Viper, and the Secretary of Defense orders the remaining second prototype Viper destroyed - which is stored in a secure NovaGen Science facility, the manufacturer of the prototype. To do the job, he calls on special agent Mike Connors.

Unaware of these proceedings, Project Viper head Nancy Burnham and her team at NovaGen - Steve Elkins, Sid Bream and Alan Stanton - are celebrating the fruition of their scientific dream. One more member, Cafferty, is on her way - but is killed by a rogue police officer, who is planning to steal the second prototype. Along with his wife, he steals the second Viper from the NovaGen high security lab, shooting several guards and technicians in the process. Mike Connors arrives at the scene, only to chase the thieves into a nearby forest, Though the rogue police officer is killed, his wife escapes along with Viper's container unscathed and unseen by Connors and military personnel. Along with another accomplice, the thieves steal a small cargo plane and head towards their base, but a catastrophic engine failure causes their aircraft to crash into a forest 50 miles north of the Mexican border near a small town of Lago Nogales. In the crash, Viper's container is broken open and ends up into the environment, killing and devouring the thieves and a couple.

Connors, Burnham and crew arrive at the crash site to investigate and trace Viper's trails of gray, gelatinous remains to the small town. After carrying out tests and experiments, investigating human disappearances caused as Viper feeds, they reach the conclusion that Viper is attracted to the uranium-contaminated town water system, where it has a concentrated point in an abandoned uranium mine. Connors orders an electromagnetic pulse bomb, though he encounters Viper at the police station and battles and kills Steve Elkins who revealed that he deliberately programmed Viper to kill humans and in doing so, rid himself of Bream and Stanton. Along with Burnham and a former suspicious sheriff Morgan, they successfully destroy Viper with the EMP bomb at the mine and escape unharmed, with the exception of the sheriff. Back at the NASA tracking facility, Connors, Burnham and the Secretary of Defense learn that the first prototype Viper aboard the shuttle Olympus re-enters atmosphere and crashed into the Pacific Ocean.

Cast
 Patrick Muldoon as Agent Mike Connors	 	
 Theresa Russell as Nancy Burnham	 	
 Billy Keane as Steve Elkins	 	
 Tim Thomerson as Sheriff Morgan	 	
 Tamara Davies as Sid Bream 	
 Daniel Quinn as Alan Stanton	 	
 Lydie Denier as Diane Cafferty, Rogue Cop's Wife	 	
 Curtis Armstrong as Keach	 	
 John Beck as Simpkins	 	
 Andy Milder as Chambers	 	
 René Rivera as Pete Gonzales	 	
 William Langley Monroe as General Cartwright	 	
 Adam Koster as C-133 Pilot	 	
 Geoff Stults as Boy In Pickup	 	
 Lorissa McComas as Girl In Pickup	 	
 Rod McCary as Dr. Shoup	 	
 Steve Purnick as Mr. Norton	 	
 Eric-James Virgets as Deputy Ferguson	 	
 Adam Gordon as Crewman Terrance	 	
 Todd Kimsey as Crewman Mitchell	 	
 Redmond Gleeson as Local Man	 	
 Steve J. Hennessy as Plainclothes Agent	 	
 Paul Preston as First NASA Suit	 	
 Eamonn Roche as Fred, Mission Control 	 	
 James Cromwell as MP 
 Joe Sabatino as MP

Other crew members
Production Designer: Robert E. Hummel
Costume Designer: Gail De Krassel
Casting: Linda Berger
Visual Effects: Foundation Imaging

Release
Project Viper debuted as a Sci Fi Pictures TV-movie on the Sci Fi Channel on April 20, 2002. It was also released to DVD and VHS later that year in August, with the DVD including a widescreen transfer.

References

External links
 

2002 television films
2002 films
Syfy original films
2000s science fiction horror films
American science fiction horror films
CineTel Films films
Films directed by Jim Wynorski
2000s monster movies
American monster movies
2000s American films